The 1925 Cork Junior Hurling Championship was the 29th staging of the Cork Junior Hurling Championship since its establishment by the Cork County Board.

St. Anne's won the championship following a 2–03 to 1–03 defeat of Midleton in the final. It was their first championship title in the grade.

References

Cork Junior Hurling Championship
Cork Junior Hurling Championship